This list shows the roads in Haute-Savoie named after a woman, order by city or agglomeration.

Annecy 
The city of Annecy has 20 roads named after a woman among 355 roads

In addition, Annecy has a high school named after Geneviève de Gaulle-Anthonioz and Meythet has library named after Louise Michel.

Annemasse

Archamps

Bonneville

Sallanches

Thônes

References

External links 
 List of streets in France

Lists of women
Lists of French women
Streets in France
Haute-Savoie